Mantashe is a South African surname. Notable people with the surname include:

Gwede Mantashe (born 1955), South African politician
Tozama Mantashe (1960–2021), South African politician, sister of Gwede

Surnames of African origin